Green spotted puffer may refer to: 

Dichotomyctere fluviatilis, sometimes called the green, Ceylon, or topaz pufferfish
Dichotomyctere nigroviridis
Dichotomyctere sabahensis, sometimes called the Sabahensis puffer

da:Ottetals kuglefisk
ja:ミドリフグ